Beeson is an unincorporated community in Mercer County, West Virginia, United States. Beeson had a post office, which closed on January 28, 2006.

References

Unincorporated communities in Mercer County, West Virginia
Unincorporated communities in West Virginia
Coal towns in West Virginia